This is a list of student boilersuit colours including the colours of equivalent student dress if no boilersuit is used.

Blekinge Institute of Technology

Chalmers University of Technology

Gothenburg School of Business, Economics and Law

Halmstad University

Sources:

Programmes

University of Gothenburg

University of Jyväskylä

Jönköping University Foundation

University of Borås

Royal Institute of Technology (KTH)

Linköping University

Universitetet

Linköping Institute of Technology

Faculty of Arts

Education

Health Department

Linnaeus University

Kalmar

Växjö

Luleå University of Technology

Faculty of Engineering (LTH), Lund University

Malmö University

University of Skövde

Stockholms universitet

Umeå University

Örebro University

References

Sweden
Universities and colleges in Sweden